The Giechburg is a partly reconstructed hilltop castle located within the town of Scheßlitz in Upper Franconia, Bavaria, Germany.  The castle has given its name to a constituent community within the town.

History
Archeological evidence indicates that this hilltop was fortified as far back as Neolithic times.  The castle enters written history in 1125, and its possession thereafter is marked by a succession of wills and bequest documents, punctuated by at least one forcible transfer in 1142.  The castle entered the possession of the prince-bishops of Bamberg in 1390, and its history thereafter is closely allied to the bishopric and the city of Bamberg.  From 1421 until 1459, a period of disorder associated with the Hussites in nearby Bohemia, the castle was further fortified and strengthened until it took its final form as a mature medieval castle with a keep.   

As gunpowder warfare matured, the Giechburg was no longer useful as a strongpoint.  It was adaptively reused by the prince-bishops, especially Johann Philipp von Gebsattel, as a hunting lodge and by later prince-bishops as the headquarters of a horse farm.  However, with secularization in 1802, the Giechburg no longer had an owner with an interest in maintenance and upkeep.  The former castle was used as a quarry for dressed stone, and became a ruin. 

The Giechburg was acquired by the district of Bamberg in 1971, and was reconstructed as a conference and hospitality center.  Signage describes the history of the castle and the topography of Upper Franconia.

References

Castles in Bavaria
Buildings and structures in Bamberg (district)